Belinda Bencic was the defending champion, but chose not to participate.

Mayo Hibi won the title, defeating Anhelina Kalinina in the final, 6–2, 5–7, 6–2.

Seeds

Draw

Finals

Top half

Bottom half

References

Main Draw

Henderson Tennis Open - Singles